Fort Macon State Park is a state park in North Carolina. The park contains the remains of Fort Hampton, which was constructed as part of the Second System of US fortifications.

Fort Hampton may also refer to:

Fort Hampton (Alabama), a fort constructed in Limestone County, Alabama to keep settlers from invading Chickasaw territory that was later garrisoned during the War of 1812